Startime International is a record label founded in 2000 by Isaac Green, owned by Sony Music Entertainment, based in New York City, and distributed by Columbia Records. Its roster includes Foster the People, Coin, Natalie Prass, Bully, Made Violent, Lewis Del Mar, and The Big Moon.

History
Green moved to Brooklyn and out of his apartment started the label, armed with one band, the French Kicks. Startime's first release was the Kick's EP Young Lawyer in late 2000, followed by releases by Brendan Benson and The Walkmen. A compilation of Startime acts has been released, Supercuts.

Roster

Current

Foster the People
COIN
Natalie Prass
Bully
Made Violent
Lewis Del Mar
The Big Moon

Past

Does It Offend You, Yeah?
French Kicks
Peter Bjorn and John
The Joggers
The Natural History
The Walkmen
Tom Vek
Wild Light

See also
 Almost Gold Recordings
 List of record labels

References

External links
 Official site
 Myspace page
 Q&A w/ Isaac Green
 ASCAP profile of Startime / interview

American independent record labels
Record labels established in 2000
Indie rock record labels
Indie pop record labels
Columbia Records
2000 establishments in New York City